Abolqāsem Lahūtī (12 October 1887 – 16 March 1957) was an Iranian-Soviet poet and political activist who was active in Iran during the Persian Constitutional Revolution and in Tajikistan in the early Soviet era.

Biography
Born on 12 October 1887 in Kermanshah to an Iranian cobbler and religious poet named Mirza Ahmad Elhami, he began writing poetry in early adolescence under the pen name Lahuti (which Encyclopædia Iranica translates as 'belonging to the world of the occult'). His first poem was printed in the newspaper Habl al-Matin (magazine) in Calcutta at the age of 18, and in his twenties his poems were published in several prestigious publications.

He soon entered politics and even received a medal from Sattar Khan for his efforts.

Initially, he went to clerical school, but then went to Bulgaria and wrote many poems on Islam. He then came back to Iran, and enlisted in the armed forces, and graduated as Captain in rank.

After being convicted by a court in Qom and sentenced to death, he fled to Turkey, but soon returned and joined forces with Sheikh Mohammad Khiabani in Tabriz. His forces defeated Mahmud Khan Puladeen's troops, but were soon disbanded by freshly dispatched forces. He fled to Baku.

While living in Nakhchivan Autonomous Republic, he became interested in Communism. After marrying a Russian student by the name of Cecilia Bakaleishchik, who would become a Persian poet and translator under the pen name Cecilia Banu (Sisil Banu), he was unable to initiate a coup d'etat against the central government of Iran, so he gave up and moved to USSR where he remained until his final days.

In 1925, he went to Dushanbe and joined the friends of Sadriddin Aini. His poetry was welcomed by audiences and gained him the position of the founder of Soviet Tajik poetry.

Lahuti is the author of the Tajik SSR anthem. Lahuti's other works include "Kovai Ohangar" ("Kaveh the Blacksmith", 1947), "Qasidai Kremel" ("Ode to the Kremlin", 1923), and "Toj va Bairaq" ("The Crown and the Flag", 1935). His collection of poetry, in six volumes, was published between 1960 and 1963.
He died on March 16, 1957, in Moscow.

References

External links

Abu’l-Qāsem Lāhuti, Encyclopædia Iranica
 
 

20th-century Iranian poets
Iranian emigrants to the Soviet Union
People from Kermanshah
1887 births
1957 deaths
Iranian prisoners sentenced to death
Prisoners sentenced to death by Iran
20th-century poets
Iranian Marxists
People of Qajar Iran